ZX Magazín was a Czech magazine for users of home computers ZX Spectrum, Didaktik, Delta, Sam Coupé and compatible computers. It was published from 1988 to 2005. It was published by different companies. When its publisher was the company Proxima - Software, the magazine was issued bimonthly.

Magazine content 
The magazine was not oriented only to computer games, the game topics was only about one-third of the whole content. The other topics that the magazine was focused to were the manuals to user programs and utilities, hardware description (either own ZX Spectrum hardware, either peripherals), courses of programming, introduction to electronics. Some issues contains reportages from actions organized by ZX Spectrum community and interviews with authors of ZX Spectrum programs.

As a speciality, the magazine Intro was put at the last page of the magazine.

Magazine issuers 
 1988 – 1991 – David Hertl
 1992 – 1994 – Proxima - Software, 
 1995 – 1997 – Zbyněk Vanžura (Heptau)
 1998 – 2005 – Matěj Kryndler (Matsoft).

The  was given to the magazine in 1993.

References

Remarks

External links 
 ZX Magazín in the list of journals and issuers by Ministry of Culture of Czech Republic
 Record about ZX Magazínu in the catalog of Northbohemian science library

1988 establishments in Czechoslovakia
2005 disestablishments in the Czech Republic
Czech-language magazines
Video game magazines published in the Czech Republic
Defunct magazines published in the Czech Republic
Magazines established in 1988
Magazines disestablished in 2005
ZX Spectrum magazines